The following is a list of affiliates of Create, a PBS sub-channel network of non-commercial educational television stations in the United States. The list is arranged alphabetically by state and based on the station's city of license and followed in parentheses by the designated market area and when different from the city of license. In most cases, this is their virtual channel number and a cable channel number with Cable Provider in the United States, with their video quality and aspect ratio size.

Current Affiliates 
Create TV is carried out by the following stations:

Previous affiliates & operators 
Statewide Connecticut: From launch until 2012 and from 2018 until 2020. 

Waco, Texas: KNCT 46.3 (2010–2018; currently a CW affiliate on 46.1 since 2019 and Start TV on 46.3) (Owner: Central Texas College; currently Gray Television)

West Palm Beach, Florida: WXEL-TV 42.2 (until 2018; removed Create affiliate)

Windsor, Vermont: WVTA 41.3 (until 2022; license surrendered)

References 

Create